Juliet Raphael Michael is a South Sudanese politician. She has served as Minister of Physical Infrastructure of Western Bahr el Ghazal since 18 May 2010.

References

Living people
South Sudanese women in politics
21st-century South Sudanese women politicians
21st-century South Sudanese politicians
Year of birth missing (living people)
People from Western Bahr el Ghazal
Place of birth missing (living people)